In mathematics, the mandelbox is a fractal with a boxlike shape found by Tom Lowe in 2010. It is defined in a similar way to the famous Mandelbrot set as the values of a parameter such that the origin does not escape to infinity under iteration of certain geometrical transformations. The mandelbox is defined as a map of continuous Julia sets, but, unlike the Mandelbrot set, can be defined in any number of dimensions. It is typically drawn in three dimensions for illustrative purposes.

Simple definition 
The simple definition of the mandelbox is this: repeatedly transform a vector z, according to the following rules:
First, for each component c of z (which corresponds to a dimension), if c is greater than 1, subtract it from 2; or if c is less than -1, subtract it from −2.
Then, depending on the magnitude of the vector, change its magnitude using some fixed values and a specified scale factor.

Generation 
The iteration applies to vector z as follows:

 function iterate(z):
     for each component in z:
         if component > 1:
             component := 2 - component
         else if component < -1:
             component := -2 - component
 
     if magnitude of z < 0.5:
         z := z * 4
     else if magnitude of z < 1:
         z := z / (magnitude of z)^2
    
     z := scale * z + c

Here, c is the constant being tested, and scale is a real number.

Properties 
A notable property of the mandelbox, particularly for scale −1.5, is that it contains approximations of many well known fractals within it.

For  the mandelbox contains a solid core. Consequently, its fractal dimension is 3, or n when generalised to n dimensions.

For  the mandelbox sides have length 4 and for  they have length .

See also 
 Mandelbulb
Buddhabrot
Lichtenberg figure

References

External links

 Gallery and description
 Images of some Mandelbox cubes
 Video : zoom in the Mandelbox cube

Fractals